Alkaliphilus  is a bacterium from the family of Clostridiaceae.

References

Further reading
 
 
 
 

Bacteria genera
Clostridiaceae